Autosomal dominant partial epilepsy with auditory features syndrome is a rare, relatively benign, hereditary epileptic disorder that is characterized by seizures, seizure-associated hearing alterations and receptive aphasia. Unlike other genetic disorders, this one does not affect intellect.

Signs & symptoms 

Symptoms of this disorder usually begin appearing in adolescence-early adulthood. People with this disorder have peculiar symptoms before and during seizures, these include:

 Buzzing
 Ringing
 Humming
 Voices
 Music
 Changes in the intensity/volume of sound

Some people have receptive aphasia before temporarily losing consciousness to a seizure
Less commonly, visual hallucinations, smell abnormalities, and/or vertigo occur before and during seizures.

People with this disorder typically have triggers that trigger their seizures. But for other people, they don't have a known trigger. Fortunately for people with ADPEAF, seizures don't usually occur in a regular basis.

Partial seizures can also occur, during these kind of seizures, a person doesn't lose consciousness. These seizures may evolve into a full seizure (due to spreading through the entire brain instead of a part of it), when this happens, they are called secondary generalized seizures

Causes 

This disorder is caused by mutations in either the LGI1 gene or the RELN gene. These mutations are inherited in an autosomal dominant fashion. Although some people with ADPEAF have been found to have mutations in other genes.

Etimology 

This condition was discovered in 1995, Ottman et al. described a family with recurrent seizures and auditory symptoms. There are only 20 families across the world that are affected with the disorder.

References 

Autosomal dominant disorders
Genetic diseases and disorders